Jesse Iwuji Motorsports is an American stock car racing team that competes part-time in the NASCAR Xfinity Series. It was founded in 2021 by NFL hall of famer, Emmitt Smith, with NASCAR driver and United States Navy Reserve officer, Jesse Iwuji, and they currently field the No. 34 Chevrolet Camaro SS for owner/driver, Jesse Iwuji.

History 
On August 21, 2021, Jesse Iwuji announced the formation of his new team, Jesse Iwuji Motorsports, that will compete full-time in the NASCAR Xfinity Series in 2022. He also announced that Emmitt Smith, a former NFL running back, would co-own the team with him. In December 2021, Iwuji announced the sponsor for his team, which would be the Equity Prime Mortgage company.

On December 9, 2022, Jesse Iwuji Motorsports filed a 4.125 million lawsuit against Equity Prime Mortgage for breach of contract.

NASCAR Xfinity Series

Car No. 34 history 
On February 7, 2022, Iwuji and Smith partnered with Chevrolet as the manufacturer for the 2022 NASCAR Xfinity Series season, with the number being 34, as a tribute to Wendell Scott. The team would run the full 33-race schedule, with Iwuji competing for Rookie of the Year honors. The team would operate out of the JD Motorsports race shop, with providing engines from Hendrick Motorsports.

The team scored its first top-10 finish when Kyle Weatherman finished 8th at New Hampshire Motor Speedway in the 2022 Crayon 200.

Car No. 34 results

References

External links 
 
 

American auto racing teams
NASCAR teams